Findaway may refer to:
 a song by Silverchair, from their album Frogstomp (1995)
 an audiobook distributor owned by Spotify